Asylum Entertainment is an American production company. The company was purchased by Legendary Entertainment for $100 million in 2013. Steve Michaels purchased it from Legendary in 2018.

Filmography

TV series

Films

Shorts

References

Television production companies of the United States
Film production companies of the United States